Jiří Granát (born 28 January 1955) is a former professional tennis player from the Czech Republic who competed for Czechoslovakia.

Career
Granát took part in the main singles draw of nine Grand Slam tournaments during his career. He made the third round of the 1979 French Open, beating Jose Luis Damiani and then Francisco González. His only other Grand Slam third round appearances both came in 1982. He reached the third round of the men's doubles at the 1982 French Open (with Stanislav Birner) and 1982 US Open (with Erick Iskersky).

On the Grand Prix tennis circuit, Granát won one title, which was the doubles at the 1981 Sofia Open. His best singles performance came at the 1977 Scandinavian Covered Court Championships in Helsinki, where he was a semi-finalist. He had a win over Peter McNamara at Rotterdam in 1983, when the Australian was ranked seventh in the world.

Granát appeared in one Davis Cup tie for Czechoslovakia, in 1977, against Ireland. He played the doubles rubber, with Tomáš Šmíd. They defeated the Irish pairing of James McCardle and John O'Brien.

He defected to Switzerland in 1983 and worked for the Swiss Tennis Federation as a coach after retiring.

Grand Prix career finals

Doubles: 1 (1–0)

References

External links
 
 
 

1955 births
Living people
Czechoslovak male tennis players
Czech male tennis players
Tennis players from Prague